Michael Rodríguez Galindo (born 29 July 1989) is a Colombian road racing cyclist, who currently rides for Colombian amateur team Fundación Herrera Team HYF. Rodriguez specialises as a climber.

Biography
Rodríguez's first strong international performance came with a 6th-place finish riding for the Colombia national team at the 2011 Tour de l'Avenir. He signed for the  team when it formed in 2012, and was retained into the 2013 season. His first high placing in an open-age race came in stage 1a of the 2013 Giro del Trentino, where he finished third as part of a breakaway in the opening stage.

Major results
2008
 5th Overall Vuelta a Bolivia
2009
 3rd Time trial, National Under-23 Road Championships
2011
 6th Overall Tour de l'Avenir

References

External links

Colombia-Coldeportes profile
Cycling Quotient profile

Colombian male cyclists
1989 births
Living people
Place of birth missing (living people)